Mary Ryan, Detective is a 1949 American crime drama, directed by Abby Berlin, which stars Marsha Hunt, John Litel, and June Vincent.

Cast list
 Marsha Hunt as Mary Ryan, also known as Mae Smith
 John Litel as Captain Billings
 June Vincent as Estelle Byron
 Harry Shannon as Sawyer
 Wm. "Bill" Phillips as Joey Gurney
 Katherine Warren as Mrs. Sawyer
 Victoria Horne as Wilma Hall
 John Dehner as Belden

References

External links
 
 
 

1949 films
1949 crime drama films
American crime drama films
Columbia Pictures films
American black-and-white films
Films directed by Abby Berlin
1940s American films
1940s English-language films